Bouzaréah is a district in Algiers Province, Algeria. It was named after its capital, Bouzaréah.

Municipalities
The district is further divided into 4 municipalities:
Bouzaréah
Béni Messous 
Ben Aknoun 
El Biar

Buildings
 Villa Susini

Notable people

Districts of Algiers Province